Ivan Corea established autism-related charities, service organisations such as the Autism Awareness Campaign UK and Autism Sunday. He took a lead role in raising awareness about autism.

Education
Corea was born in Colombo, Sri Lanka and educated at S Thomas’ Preparatory School Kollupitiya and S. Thomas' College Mt Lavinia. His classmates included Uthum Herat, Suresh Thambipillai and R. D. Gunaratne.

His family emigrated to United Kingdom, and he attended Chalfonts County Secondary School in Chalfont, St. Peter's Buckinghamshire and Archbishop Tenison's Grammar School in Croydon. He went on to attend colleges attached to Brunel University and Greenwich University.

Autism
Corea has received many awards for his work in autism, including the Charity Times Charity Personality of the Year Award, the Windrush Community Service Award, the BBC TV Community Award (runner-up), the Asian Woman Magazine Community Award, the Beacon Fellowship Highly Commended Award and the Daily Mail Unsung Heroes Award Certificate. He has been honoured as an'Autism Light,' honouring heroes who have campaigned for autism by a website in the United States of America

He has a record of over 25 years of service as an educator and is a former Fellow of the King's Fund in London. He has advised Her Majesty's Government as a Consultant to the Ethnic Minorities Division of the Department of Work & Pensions and a Task force of Ministers.

Journalism
Corea's work includes contributions to the Third World Impact books, published in the United Kingdom, the Visible Minority Report, presented to the Commonwealth Heads of Government Meeting in Kuala Lumpur. In 1981 he was nominated for the United Nations Media Peace Prize in London.

London 2012 Ambassador 
Corea was appointed an Olympic Ambassador by Lord Sebastian Coe in 2004 and was fully involved in persuading the public, particularly minority ethnic communities and disability communities in the United Kingdom, to back the London 2012 Olympic and Paralympic bid.

Family 
Corea and his wife Charika were inspired to initiate their autism awareness campaign by their son Charin, who is autistic.

Corea is the son of Vernon Corea, a well-known broadcaster who worked at Radio Ceylon (SLBC), Radio Worldwide and the British Broadcasting Corporation. He is the grandson of clergyman Ivan Corea who was Rural Dean of Colombo, of the Church of Ceylon and was Examining Chaplain to the Bishop of Colombo, the nephew of Ambassador Ernest Corea, who was his father's younger brother, and the great-grandson of Dr. James Alfred Ernest Corea.

In 2016 the family moved to California to follow a theology course.

References

Alumni of S. Thomas' College, Mount Lavinia
Living people
Year of birth missing (living people)
Place of birth missing (living people)